Sundadanio is a genus of cyprinid fishes from freshwater habitats, typically peat swamps and blackwater streams, in Borneo and Sumatra (as well as nearby smaller islands) in southeast Asia. Species of the two genera are often found together.

Species
There are currently eight recognized species in this genus:

 Sundadanio atomus Conway, Kottelat & H. H. Tan, 2011
 Sundadanio axelrodi (Brittan, 1976)
 Sundadanio echinus Conway, Kottelat & H. H. Tan, 2011
 Sundadanio gargula Conway, Kottelat & H. H. Tan, 2011
 Sundadanio goblinus Conway, Kottelat & H. H. Tan, 2011
 Sundadanio margarition Conway, Kottelat & H. H. Tan, 2011
 Sundadanio retiarius Conway, Kottelat & H. H. Tan, 2011
 Sundadanio rubellus Conway, Kottelat & H. H. Tan, 2011

References

 
Cyprinidae genera
Cyprinid fish of Asia
Taxa named by Maurice Kottelat
Taxa named by Kai-Erik Witte